Ayahuasca is a brew of various psychoactive plants.

Ayahuasca may also refer to:

Ayahuasca (Pelt album), 2001
Ayahuasca (Baiyu album), 2013
Ayahuasca: Welcome to the Work, a 2013 album by Ben Lee
Banisteriopsis caapi, one of the main ingredients in ayahuasca
"Ayahuasca" (song), a 2015 electronic track by Hoax23
"Ayahuasca" (song), a 2016 single by Swedish-Italian singer Veronica Maggio